Iraq Medal may refer to:
Iraq Medal (Australia), Australian Defence Force campaign medal for service in Iraq, 2003–2013 
New Zealand General Service Medal 2002 (Iraq 2003), New Zealand Defence Force campaign medal for service in Iraq since 2003
Iraq Medal (United Kingdom), British Forces campaign medal, for service 2003–2011
Iraq Campaign Medal, United States armed forces military decoration, for service 2003–2011